Ikemefula Charles "Ike" Ibeabuchi (born February 2, 1973) is a Nigerian former professional boxer who competed from 1994 to 1999 in the heavyweight division. He defeated the previously undefeated highly ranked contender David Tua in 1997 and another highly ranked contender and future world champion Chris Byrd in 1999. He was ranked by BoxRec as the world's No.8 heavyweight in 1997 and 1998, and as No.10 heavyweight in 1999. After compiling an impressive record of 20–0 with 15 knockouts, Ibeabuchi's natural talent and potential inside the ring was eventually overshadowed by emotional instability and violent tendencies in his personal life. After a series of run-ins with law enforcement, he was imprisoned in Las Vegas in July 1999, after submitting an Alford plea for charges on sexual misconduct. This also marked the end of his professional boxing career.

In November 2015, Ibeabuchi was released from the custody of United States Immigration and Customs Enforcement (ICE) after completing his 16-year Nevada state prison sentence without incident. He announced his desire to return to the ring to resume his professional boxing career, but was rearrested before his comeback could take place.

Amateur career
Ike planned on joining the Nigerian military before he witnessed Buster Douglas knock out Mike Tyson in 1990. Inspired by the fight, Ike started boxing as an amateur. Ike twice defeated countryman and eventual 1996 Olympic Bronze medalist Duncan Dokiwari. Ibeabuchi emigrated to the United States and moved to the Dallas area with his mother in 1993. Ibeabuchi won the Dallas and Texas State Golden Gloves tournaments at heavyweight in 1994.

Professional career
Under the guidance of former world welterweight champion Curtis Cokes, Ike made his professional debut at heavyweight with a second-round knockout of Ismael Garcia on October 13, 1994.

Battle with David Tua
After winning 16 straight fights from the start of his career, Ike made a big jump in competition and fought undefeated prospect David Tua for the WBC International Heavyweight title on June 7, 1997. Tua was 27-0 and considered by many analysts to be 'the next Mike Tyson'.

Both boxers threw bombs and neither took a backward step all night. Ibeabuchi and Tua set a CompuStat heavyweight division record with 1,730 punches thrown. Ike also set the individual CompuStat record by throwing 975 punches and averaging 81 per round. The heavyweight average is around 50. Ibeabuchi won a unanimous 12-round decision over Tua with scores of 117–111, 116–113, and 115–114. The fight established Ibeabuchi as the top contender for the world heavyweight title.

Troubles outside the ring
A couple of months after the Tua fight, Ibeabuchi abducted the 15-year-old son of his former girlfriend and slammed his car into a concrete pillar on Interstate 35 north of Austin, Texas. According to the criminal complaint, the boy suffered 'numerous injuries' from the accident 'and will never walk normally again'. The courts concluded Ibeabuchi was trying to commit suicide, and he was sentenced to 120 days in jail after pleading guilty to false imprisonment. Ibeabuchi also paid a $500,000 civil settlement.

Ibeabuchi developed a new persona based on his nickname, 'The President'. At times when he was being churlish or refusing to complete a simple requirement such as attending a weigh-in, his handlers would appeal to The President's regal nature by convincing him it was the noble thing to do. "There were times when he thought he was really a president", boxing promoter and former HBO Sports executive Lou DiBella said. "He would get into these mental states where he insisted on people calling him 'The President'. It was his alter ego, where 'I am The President,' not of the United States, but maybe president of the world."

Once, Ibeabuchi wielded a knife during a dinner meeting in New York to discuss a possible three fight HBO deal. "We were having a fine meal at a nice restaurant", Promoter Cedric Kushner said, "and mid-course Ike picked up a big carving knife, slammed it into the table and screamed 'They knew it! They knew it! The belts belong to me! Why don't they just give them back?'" "That was a peculiar experience", Kushner said. "That wasn't the type of conduct I expected to romance the guy from HBO. He (Ibeabuchi) was like a Viking."

Comeback
Ibeabuchi returned to the ring after 13 months of inactivity, scoring a first-round knockout over Tim Ray in July 1998. Two months later, he stopped Everton Davis in nine rounds.

Ibeabuchi's next fight was against Chris Byrd in March 1999. Byrd, a 1992 Olympic silver medalist and a future world heavyweight champion, was a quick and slick southpaw with a record of 26–0.

After four rounds, the three judges had the fight scored evenly: 38–38 even, 39-37 for Ibeabuchi, and 39–37 for Byrd. In the fifth round, Ibeabuchi landed a devastating left uppercut which sent Byrd to the canvas. Byrd made it back to his feet, but he was quickly knocked back down. Byrd once again rose, but he was trapped against the ropes and was taking punishment as the referee waved it off at the 2:59 mark.

Following the win over Byrd, Ibeabuchi turned down $700,000 to fight fringe contender Jeremy Williams, and he also turned down $1 million for a showdown with the undefeated Michael Grant.

Imprisonment
In July 1999, Ibeabuchi was staying at The Mirage Hotel and Casino in Las Vegas when he phoned a local escort service and had a woman sent to his room. The 21-year-old woman said later she was there to strip and nothing else. She claimed Ibeabuchi attacked her in the walk-in closet after she demanded to be paid up front. Ibeabuchi barricaded himself in the bathroom and police discharged pepper spray under the door until he surrendered.

Ibeabuchi's legal defense faced the further difficulty of the Clark County DA's reopening of a similar sexual assault allegation against him from eight months earlier which took place at Treasure Island Hotel and Casino. Ibeabuchi was released on bail and placed under house arrest, able to train and fight again until his trial. He was remanded after two more similar allegations surfaced from Arizona.

Ibeabuchi was deemed incompetent to stand trial and was sent to a state facility. Medical experts concluded he exhibited bipolar disorder and a judge granted permission to force-medicate him. Eight months later, two and a half years after his arrest, he was ruled cogent enough to plea.

Ibeabuchi subsequently entered an Alford plea, pleading guilty while not admitting guilt to avoid going to trial.  Ibeabuchi was sentenced to two to ten years for battery with intent to commit a crime (from which he was later paroled), and three to 20 years for attempted sexual assault, with the sentences to be served consecutively.

While incarcerated, Ibeabuchi earned three college associate degrees from Western Nevada Community College, in General Studies, Business, and Management. He also earned a paralegal certificate by correspondence from Blackstone Career Institute in Allentown, Pennsylvania. His Las Vegas conviction was overturned by the Nevada Supreme Court in 2007 and he expected to be released, but the lower courts abandoned the ruling. The Nevada Supreme Court subsequently affirmed its earlier ruling of its overturning of Ibeabuchi's Las Vegas conviction again, and Ibeabuchi's Nevada conviction was eventually overturned, vacated, and discharged.

Release, planned comeback, rearrest, and rerelease
Ibeabuchi completed his sentence in the Nevada Department of Corrections. Prior to this, Ibeabuchi was moved to the Washoe County Jail on February 28, 2014, and then he was transferred by United States Immigration and Customs Enforcement (ICE) to the Eloy Detention Center in Eloy, Arizona.

Ibeabuchi was released by USCIS in November 2015 as a free man when Nigeria declined to provide travel documents. Ibeabuchi enlisted the help of Mike Koncz, an adviser of Manny Pacquiao, in an attempt to make a boxing comeback. In good health, Ibeabuchi hoped to fight his first comeback bout in the near future, but he was waiting to resolve his immigration and United States citizenship status with USCIS first. He holds a green card and his citizenship was pending only the formal swearing in. However, in April 2016, Ibeabuchi was arrested for violating the conditions of his probation in Gilbert, Arizona, based on an old warrant dating back to 2003 that he claimed to be unaware of.

Ibeabuchi was released on September 23, 2020, from the Arizona State penal system after serving required time, and his probationary status was overturned on appeal. He is being held at the United States Immigration, Customs and Enforcement (ICE) in Eloy, Arizona, during the COVID-19 pandemic until his swearing in ceremony and the formal awarding of U.S. citizenship can be scheduled, either while in detainee custody or after final release.

Professional boxing record

References

External links

1973 births
Living people
Nigerian expatriate sportspeople in the United States
Sportspeople convicted of crimes
Heavyweight boxers
Nigerian expatriates in the United States
Nigerian rapists
Nigerian male boxers